Juuso Rämö (born May 7, 1994) is a Finnish professional ice hockey player. He is currently playing for the Haugesund Seagulls of the Norwegian First Division.

Rämö made his Liiga debut playing with Ilves during the 2013–14 Liiga season.

References

External links

1994 births
Living people
Finnish ice hockey forwards
Ilves players
KeuPa HT players
KOOVEE players
Lempäälän Kisa players
Ice hockey people from Tampere